Curzio Maltese (30 March 1959 – 26 February 2023) was an Italian journalist and politician.

Biography
Maltese was born in Milan and raised in Sesto San Giovanni, and the brother of RAI sports journalist Cinzia Maltese. After working at factories and on independent radio, he became a journalist.

Maltese started reporting on sports and news for the newspapers La Gazzetta dello Sport, La Stampa, and La Notte. He was a columnist for the newspaper La Repubblica and the weekly newspaper Il Sabato di Repubblica, where he also covered television and film criticism.

In 2014, he ran for the European elections as top candidate in the northwest Italian constituency for The Other Europe list, in support of Alexīs Tsipras as President of the European Commission, obtaining 31,980 preferences. Despite being the first of the unelected on his list, he entered the European Parliament following the renunciation of Moni Ovadia and sat in the GUE/NGL group. In 2015, he entered the national presidency of Left Ecology Freedom, the party led by Nichi Vendola. In 2017, he was on the promoting committee of the Italian Left.

References

External links
 

1959 births
2023 deaths
MEPs for Italy 2014–2019
21st-century Italian politicians
Politicians from Milan
The Other Europe MEPs
Left Ecology Freedom politicians
Italian Left politicians
University of Milan alumni
Journalists from Milan
Italian sports journalists
La Repubblica people